Plutonium Blonde is a 2008 album by The Legendary Pink Dots.

Track listing

Personnel
 Edward Ka-Spel - vocals, keyboards, devices
 The Silverman - synthesizers, keyboards, devices
 Martijn De Kleer - acoustic and electric guitars, fuzz bass, banjo and exotic percussion
 Niels van Hoorn - saxophones, flute, bass flute and bass clarinet
 Raymond Steeg - mixing and engineering

References

2008 albums
The Legendary Pink Dots albums